NLPC may refer to:

National Legal and Policy Center
Natural Law Party of Canada
 Provincial Court of Newfoundland and Labrador